Ihor Mihalevskyi (born March 18, 1985) is a Ukrainian footballer.

Playing career 
Mihalevskyi began his career with FC Karpaty-3 Lviv in the Ukrainian Second League in 2001. The following year he made it to the Ukrainian Premier League with the senior squad FC Karpaty Lviv. He played in the lower leagues of Ukraine with FC Rava Rava-Ruska, Karpaty Kamianka Buzska, FC Halychyna Lviv. In 2007, he went across the border to Poland to play with KS Spartakus Szarowola, and with Hetman Zamość of the II liga. In 2008, he was loaned to GKS Bełchatów of the Ekstraklasa. Later he would spend time with Stal Stalowa Wola, Start Otwock, Motor Lublin in the I liga, and II liga. He returned to Ukraine to play with FC Rukh Vynnyky, and FC Sambir. In 2015, he went overseas to Canada to sign with Toronto Atomic FC of the Canadian Soccer League. He recorded his first goal for the club on May 9, 2015 in a match against Niagara United.

References 

1985 births
Living people
Ukrainian footballers
FC Karpaty-3 Lviv players
FC Karpaty Lviv players
GKS Bełchatów players
Stal Stalowa Wola players
Motor Lublin players
FC Rukh Lviv players
Toronto Atomic FC players
Ukrainian Premier League players
Ekstraklasa players
Canadian Soccer League (1998–present) players
FC Rava Rava-Ruska players
FC Halychyna Lviv players
Association football forwards
Ukrainian Second League players